Serhiy Bakun (born 21 February 1964 in Kyiv, in the Ukrainian SSR of the Soviet Union) is a former Ukrainian head-coach of Desna Chernihiv U19.

Coaching career
In 2003 he coached the amateur team "Polissya" (Dobryanka). From 2004 to May 2007 he helped to train Desna Chernihiv, and on May 7, 2007 he was appointed acting head of the Chernihiv club, which he managed until June 25, 2007. After that, until June 2008, he continued to help coach Desna. From June to October 2008, he headed Desna-2 Chernihiv. From 2009 to June 2011 he worked as the head coach of Yednist-2., where he won the Chernihiv Oblast Football Federation in 2009, 2010

Honours
FC Yednist' Plysky 2
 Ukrainian Football Amateur League: 2009
 Chernihiv Oblast Football Federation: (3) 2009, 2010

Desna Chernihiv
 Ukrainian Second League: 2005–06

Polissia Dobrianka
 Chernihiv Oblast Football Federation: (1) 2003

References

External links
 Profile on Official website of FC Desna Chernihiv

1962 births
Living people
Soviet footballers
Association football defenders
FC Desna Chernihiv managers
FC Desna-2 Chernihiv managers
FC Desna-3 Chernihiv managers